Lisle is a village in DuPage County, Illinois, United States. The population was 22,390 at the 2010 census, and in 2019 the population was recorded to be 23,270. It is part of the Chicago metropolitan area and the Illinois Technology and Research Corridor. It is also the headquarters of the Nuclear Regulatory Commission Region III.

History

In 1830, Bailey Hobson, a Quaker, was the first settler in what would become DuPage County, Illinois, as well as Lisle Township. The town of Lisle was settled in 1832, by brothers James C. Hatch and Luther A. Hatch after the close of the Black Hawk War. The two brothers acquired land near what is now Ogden Avenue and began a small farming community named "DuPage" or "East DuPage" because, of its proximity to the east branch of the DuPage River.

In 1831, DuPage County was founded. To the west of the Lisle settlement, on the west branch of the DuPage river, brothers Joseph and John Naper founded the Naper Settlement, present-day Naperville, Illinois.

Lisle experienced many firsts in the decade of 1830s during the earliest years of settlement in DuPage County. In 1832, James C. Hatch set aside some of his land for the first and only community burial ground in the East DuPage Settlement. Today, Lisle Cemetery is one of the oldest registered cemeteries in the state of Illinois. Hatch operated the first wagon and blacksmith shop and began Lisle's infant dairy industry with a creamery. Formed in 1833, the East DuPage Religious Society had a circuit rider preacher with house churches and was the first Christian organization in DuPage County, which later became the First Congregational Church of DuPage in 1842. The first post office was managed by John Thompson in 1834, and the first log schoolhouse was constructed in that same year and later replaced, in 1837, with a frame structure.

In 1849, DuPage County formed its first townships, and the name Lisle was first proposed by early settler Alonzo B. Chatfield of Lisle, New York; the proposal was accepted, creating the Lisle Township. The village was incorporated on June 26, 1956, and was also named after Lisle, New York. Another reason for the DuPage township name change was that there was another town in Will County with the name DuPage.

Another story of the origin of the Lisle name was that the town was named after the late S. Lisle Smith of Chicago.

In 1864, the Chicago, Burlington and Quincy Railroad arrived along with a newly constructed depot. In 1874, a fire destroyed the Lisle Station depot, but it was later rebuilt by the CB&Q Railroad. Today, commuter rail service is provided by Metra.

On July 4, 2006, Lisle celebrated its 50th birthday by hosting the state's biggest fireworks display.

Geography
Most of Lisle lies within the watershed of the east branch of the DuPage River.

Demographics
As of the 2020 census there were 24,223 people, 9,787 households, and 5,547 families residing in the village. The racial makeup of the village was 67.64% White, 6.13% African American, 0.35% Native American, 15.26% Asian, 0.03% Pacific Islander, 3.77% from other races, and 6.81% from two or more races. Hispanic or Latino of any race were 8.93% of the population.

There were 9,787 households, out of which 48.41% had children under the age of 18 living with them, 48.52% were married couples living together, 5.51% had a female householder with no husband present, and 43.32% were non-families. 35.38% of all households were made up of individuals, and 12.00% had someone living alone who was 65 years of age or older. The average household size was 3.09 and the average family size was 2.30.

The village's age distribution consisted of 21.1% under the age of 18, 10.6% from 18 to 24, 28.8% from 25 to 44, 24.1% from 45 to 64, and 15.4% who were 65 years of age or older. The median age was 36.8 years. For every 100 females, there were 107.1 males. For every 100 females age 18 and over, there were 105.6 males.

The median income for a household in the village was $96,945, and the median income for a family was $133,133. Males had a median income of $67,435 versus $49,270 for females. The per capita income for the village was $50,750. About 2.6% of families and 5.7% of the population were below the poverty line, including 6.2% of those under age 18 and 3.7% of those age 65 or over.

Economy
CA Technologies, Molex, Armour-Eckrich, and Navistar are among the largest companies based in Lisle.

Top employers
According to the Village's 2018 Comprehensive Annual Financial Report, the top ten employers in the city are:

Arts and culture

Points of interest
The Lisle Library contains resources and hosts art exhibits.
Jurica-Suchy Nature Museum.
Pioneer village museum a Lisle Station Park.
Created by the Chicago Bulls and White Sox, the Bulls/Sox Training Academy runs year-round training programs in baseball, fastpitch softball, and basketball for youths.

Education

Primary and secondary schools
Lisle's school district is Lisle Community Unit School District 202; a portion of Lisle lies in the Naperville Community Unit School District 203. The majority of high school students living in Lisle attend Lisle Senior High School.

Middle schools:
Kennedy Junior High School (serving District 203)
Lisle Junior High (serving District 202)
St. Joan of Arc (Grades PreK-8)

High schools:
Lisle High School (serving District 202)
Chesterton Academy of the Holy Family (Catholic)
Benet Academy (Catholic - Benedictine)

Colleges and universities
Benedictine University, formerly known as Illinois Benedictine College, has its  campus in Lisle.
National Louis University is located on Warrenville Road in Lisle.
 The Center for Entrepreneurship of the College of DuPage is located in the One Corporate Lakes building in Lisle.
Universal Technical Institute is located off of Warrenville Road in Lisle.  The Lisle campus trains students for careers in Automotive, Diesel and Welding.

Notable people

 Glenn Earl, safety for the professional American football team, Houston Texans
 John Grochowski, author on gambling, radio personality, and Chicago Sun-Times newspaper columnist
 Lester Lewis, television writer, producer, and supervisory producer for sitcoms Flight of the Conchords, Caroline in the City, The Larry Sanders Show, and The Office
 Joy Morton, founder of Morton Salt Company and Morton Arboretum; son of Julius Sterling Morton founder of Arbor Day
 Brian Plotkin, midfielder with the professional American soccer teams, Chicago Fire, Indiana Invaders, Carolina RailHawks, and Columbus Crew
 Frank Kaminsky, Charlotte Hornets center, consensus NCAA Division I men's player of the year for 2014–15 at Wisconsin, and Benet Academy graduate

See also

Lisle, Missouri
Lisle (town), New York
Lisle (village), New York
List of towns and villages in Illinois

References

Bibliography
Blanchard, Rufus.  History of Du Page County, Illinois.  Chicago:  O.L. Baskin & Co. 1882.
Richmond, C. W.  History of Du Page County Illinois, Du Page County (Ill.) Chicago:  Richmond Knickerbocker & Hodder, 1877. 
Richmond, C.W. and Henry F. Valette.  A history of the County of Du Page, Illinois.  Chicago:  Scripps, Bross & Spears, 1857.

External links

 

 
1832 establishments in Illinois
Chicago metropolitan area
Populated places established in 1832
Villages in DuPage County, Illinois
Villages in Illinois